Christian Schwartz (born December 30, 1977 in Concord, New Hampshire, United States) is an American type designer. He has been awarded the German Design Award and the Prix Charles Peignot.

Life 
A graduate of the Communication Design program at Carnegie Mellon University, Schwartz first worked at MetaDesign Berlin, developing typefaces for Volkswagen and logos for various corporations. He then returned to the US and joined the design staff at Font Bureau.

Schwartz has worked independently in 2001, first forming Orange Italic with product designer Dino Sanchez and recently Schwartzco Inc. He has released commercial fonts with Village, FontFont, Emigre, House Industries and Font Bureau. Many of Schwartz’s typefaces have been proprietary designs for corporations such as Bosch and Deutsche Bahn, both with noted designer Erik Spiekermann, and EMI, for the marketing of George Harrison’s posthumous final album. Schwartz has also designed typefaces for many publications including the US edition of Esquire and the extensive Guardian Egyptian family, with Paul Barnes, for the redesign of The Guardian newspaper in 2005. With Barnes he set up the digital font company Commercial Type in 2007.

Schwartz’s typefaces have been honored by the Smithsonian's Cooper-Hewitt National Design Museum, the New York Type Director's Club, and the International Society of Typographic Designers. His work with Barnes has been honored by D&AD and, as part of the Guardian redesign team, they were shortlisted for the Designer of the Year prize by the Design Museum in London. In 2006, Schwartz and Barnes were named two of the 40 most influential designers under 40 by Wallpaper* magazine.

Typefaces
Typefaces designed by Christian Schwartz include:

References

External links
Schwartzco Inc.
Christian Schwartz

1977 births
Living people
People from Concord, New Hampshire
Carnegie Mellon University College of Fine Arts alumni
American typographers and type designers